is a Japanese author, punk rock singer, poet, and actor.

History
Machida formed a punk rock band called Inu (meaning "dog" in Japanese) in 1978, for which he used the stage name Machida Machizō. Inu released their first album, Meshi Kuuna! (literally "Don't eat!") in 1981. The band split shortly after the album release. He went on to form a number of bands and released several albums. His albums earned reasonable critical acclaims but the commercial success was limited.

His first literary work, Kūge, was published in 1992, and included a selection of his poems. His first novel, Gussun Daikoku, was published in 1996. It earned him the Bunkamura Deux Magots Literary Award. His unique style of story-telling marked by non-sense, irreverence, and slapstick is influenced by Kamigata (Kansai) Rakugo and Jidaigeki (samurai dramas). Some critics link him to self-destructive I Novel writers before the World War II such as Kamura Isota and Chikamatsu Shūkō. Oda Sakunosuke is also cited as one of his influences.

He won the 123rd Akutagawa Prize with Kiregire ("Shreds") in 2000 and the Tanizaki Prize with Kokuhaku ("Confession") in 2005.

On June 14, 2007, Machida got into an argument with his friend and rock musician Tomoyasu Hotei about a band they planned on forming together. There was a physical altercation and after learning that his injuries would take two weeks to heal, Machida filed a police report on June 18. Hotei was ordered to pay a fine of 300,000 yen on October 1.

Discography
Albums
 Meshi Kuuna! by Inu (1981)
 Ushiwakamaru Nametottara Dotsuitaru Zo by Inu (Published in 1984, recorded in 1979)
 Doterai Yatsura by Machida Machizo from Shifuku Dan (1986)
 Hona, Donaisee Iune by Machida Machizo (1987)
 Harafuri by Machida Machizo + Kitazawa Gumi (1992)
 Chūshajō no Yohane by Machida Machizo + Kitazawa Gumi (1994)
 Dōnikanaru by Machida Ko + The Glory (1995)
 Nōnai Shuffle Kakumei by Machida Ko (1997)
 Miracle Young by Miracle Young (2003)
 Machida Kō Group Live 2004 Oct 6th by Machida Ko Group (2004)

Singles
 Kokoro no Unitto by Machi Tai (2002)

Selected filmography
He played major roles in the following films.
 Burst City directed by Gakuryū Ishii (1982)
 Endless Waltz directed by Kōji Wakamatsu (1995)
 H Story directed by Nobuhiro Suwa (2001)
 Goldfish directed by Shin'ichi Fujinuma (2023)

Selected literary works 
 Kūge - His debut poem selection 1992
 Kussun Daikoku - Bunkamura Deux Magots Literary Award 1996
 Ore, Nanshin Shite 1999 co-authored with Nobuyoshi Araki
 Shreds - Akutagawa Prize 2000
 Gonge no Odoriko - Kawabata Yasunari Literary Award 2003
 Confession - Tanizaki Prize 2005

References

External links 
Official Machida Kou WebSite 
Ko Machida at J'Lit Books from Japan 
Synopsis of Punk Samurai and the Cult (Panku Samurai Kiraretesoro) at JLPP (Japanese Literature Publishing Project) 

1962 births
Living people
Japanese punk rock musicians
Japanese male actors
Akutagawa Prize winners
People from Sakai, Osaka
Japanese male short story writers
21st-century Japanese short story writers
21st-century male writers